19th Street is a streetcar station located east of the intersection of Benning Rd and 19th Street. It is located on the H Street/Benning Road Line of the DC Streetcar system.

History 
19th Street station opened to the public as one of the original stations on February 27, 2016.

Station layout
The station consists of one island platform in the center of Benning Road.

References

H Street/Benning Road Line
Streetcars in Washington, D.C.
DC Streetcar stops
Electric railways in Washington, D.C.
Street railways in Washington, D.C.
750 V DC railway electrification
Railway stations in the United States opened in 2016